Cremaster is a term derived from the Greek verb  = "I hang (transitive)", not from Latin  = "to burn". It may refer to:

 The cremaster muscle, part of genital anatomy in human males
 Cremaster reflex, a reflex in the muscle
 A hook-shaped protuberance from the rear of certain chrysalis casings
 The Cremaster Cycle, a 2002 art project by Matthew Barney